The  (Caprice on Danish and Russian Airs), Op. 79, is a caprice for flute, oboe, clarinet and piano, composed by Camille Saint-Saëns in 1887. The inspiration for using Danish and Russian airs can be linked to the dedicatee Maria Feodorovna, a Danish princess who became Empress of Russia in 1881 as the spouse of Alexander III.

History 
In 1887, Saint-Saëns was engaged by the French Red Cross for seven Easter concerts in Russia with the Imperial Opera Orchestra. He invited flutist Paul Taffanel, oboist Georges Gillet and clarinetist  to come with him, and wrote the Caprice sur des airs danois et russes specially for them, just before leaving Paris.

The premiere took place on 21 April 1887 in Saint Petersburg, with the composer on the piano. The highlight of the concerts was reportedly the Caprice, though the programs also included various piano pieces by Saint-Saëns and ballet music from his operas, as well as his works for flute and orchestra (Tarantelle, Romance, and Prélude du Déluge), oboe solos by Handel, Gillet and Diémer, and clarinet works by Weber, Mozart and Saint-Saëns.

Anton Rubinstein, at that time director of the Saint Petersburg Conservatory, was reportedly so impressed that he made all the wind students attend the final concert in Saint Petersburg on 26 April, so they could "get some idea of exactly what could be achieved on these instruments".

After two more concerts in Moscow, the four musicians returned to Paris, though they would again present the work in London in June that year.

Saint-Saëns would give another performance of the work on 31 August 1904 in Rio de Janeiro, together with Pedro de Assis, Agostinho Gouvéa, and Francisco Nunes.

Publication history 
On 17 April 1887, a few days before the premiere, Saint-Saëns wrote to his publisher Durand: "We rehearsed the caprice for Flute, Oboe, Clarinet and Piano. Do not engrave it yet, I will make some modifications. No need to hurry." After the premiere, he wrote on 30 April: "At first the quartet was so popular that I didn't dare to change anything but minor details." The work was finally published in September that year.

Saint-Saëns did not wish for the work to be arranged in different instrumentation, writing to Durand on 30 November 1889: "I refuse to arrange the Russian piece, and I would not like it to be arranged. On reflection, I became convinced that it would become insipid, deprived of the instruments for which it was made." Nevertheless, A. Benfeld, a close friend and admirer of Saint-Saëns who was also known as Albert Kopff, made an arrangement for two pianos which was published in January 1896, and performed by Juliette Toutain and Louise Lhote at a Société d'art concert in Salle Pleyel on 20 December that year.

Structure 

The work consists of a single movement, taking approximately 11 minutes to perform. Structurally, it can be divided into three distinct sections: an introduction, a Danish air with variations, and two Russian airs with variations and a coda. Each of the three themes is introduced by a different wind instrument.

Analysis 
The Caprice begins with a virtuosic introduction, featuring fast-running scales and arpeggios:

The end of the introduction is marked by a grand pause, after which the Danish air (Theme A) is introduced in a flute solo over piano accompaniment in measure 38:

The theme is immediately repeated by the oboe. A set of four variations on Theme A follow, in the format of "successively quicker figuration". A brief piano interlude, once again ending in a grand pause, marks the transition to the Russian airs.

The first Russian air (Theme B), marked Moderato ad libitum, is introduced by a lyric oboe solo over piano accompaniment in measure 122:

A clarinet solo immediately repeats the theme. A new section, marked Allegro vivace, begins with the piano playing a fast-moving sixteenth note accompaniment. A clarinet solo introduces the second Russian air (Theme C) in measure 159:

The variations on the Russian themes are different in style compared to the Danish variations. The first variation of Theme B is a brilliant rendition with octave jumps and thick chords in the piano, also incorporating elements from the Introduction. A reprise of Theme C is followed by three distinct variations: the first variation features a triplet rhythm in the wind instruments, while the piano plays the theme, the second is a canon, and the third is based on the second half of the theme, also being featured in the final coda.

The first Russian air returns in measure 335 with a warmer tone in the oboe, with the other wind instruments joining later. All instruments finally come together once more in measure 343, leading up to the coda.

Wei-Hsien Lien gives a detailed structural analysis of the Caprice:

Reception 
At the premiere, the Caprice "greatly pleased the court", and made Saint-Saëns, Taffanel, Gillet and Turban repeat their performance in London two months later.

A contemporary critic for the Neue Zeitschrift für Musik, who attended a chamber music festival in Bonn in 1905, where the work was performed by members of the Société des instruments à vent, was less impressed: "The performance of Gouvy's Octet and Saint-Saëns' Quartet (Caprice sur des Airs danois et russes) on the third day was perfectly beautiful; only the choice of Saint-Saëns' Quartet is to be regretted, since this piece may be very beautifully crafted, but musically it is insignificant and certainly does not belong to the best that Saint-Saëns created. Only the themes in it, which Saint-Saëns did not compose himself, are attractive; the rest may be of interest to the music theorist, but it makes little difference to the listener. The work was completely out of the scope of the program."

Sabina Teller Ratner comments that the Caprice "exploits the wonderful hues and nuances of the woodwind palette: both the expressive and the mournful are interspersed with sparkling passages for the piano."

Edward Blakeman writes of the piece:

References

Notes

Sources

External links 

Chamber music by Camille Saint-Saëns
1887 compositions
Compositions in B-flat major
Music with dedications
Compositions for flute
Compositions for oboe
Compositions for clarinet
Compositions for piano quartet